Nicobar serpent eagle can refer to two species:

 Great Nicobar serpent eagle (Spilornis klossi) 
 Central Nicobar serpent eagle (Spilornis minimus), often considered a subspecies of the crested serpent eagle (Spilornis cheela)

Animal common name disambiguation pages